"Breakage" is the fifth episode of the second season of the American television drama series Breaking Bad. It was written by Moira Walley-Beckett and directed by Johan Renck. This episode marks the introduction of Jane Margolis, portrayed by Krysten Ritter. The episode was dedicated to Kim Manners.

Plot 
Walter White finishes his first round of chemotherapy and is told he will learn the results in two months' time, around when his baby is due. However, Walt begins to feel overwhelmed by the growing medical bills, and the money he made from Tuco Salamanca is running out. While he is vomiting into the toilet, he finds something clogging it – the packet of cigarettes Skyler White was smoking.

Jesse Pinkman returns to Clovis to make good on his word: he pays for the towing and repair of his gate. He also works out a deal to store his RV in Clovis' lot and buys a used car from him. Next, he rents an apartment from Jane Margolis, who manages the property and lives next door. Although he likes the space, he has no credit history and can only pay in cash. She initially refuses to rent to him but eventually agrees after raising the price for cash only.

Hank Schrader is promoted to a high-ranking Albuquerque liaison for the DEA, and will have to split his time between the city and El Paso, Texas. He goes out to celebrate with his friends but has a panic attack on the elevator ride down. The next day, he takes off work to bottle some of the beer he has brewed at home. Marie Schrader is confused at this behavior, but he assures her everything is all right. After she leaves, a bottle breaks during capping, cutting his hand.

Meanwhile, Walt and Jesse meet again to discuss how to distribute their meth. Jesse does not want to work on his own now that the DEA has found him, and suggests building a network of dealers so that they can be both distributors and producers. Walt is initially reluctant, but Jesse threatens to walk if they don't follow his plan. Later, Jesse invites his friends Combo, Skinny Pete, and Badger to his apartment, and discusses employing them as dealers.

At a cookout celebrating Hank's promotion, Skyler demands that Marie apologize for giving Skyler the stolen tiara, or it will irreversibly drive a wedge between them; Marie tearfully does so.

Jesse's dealers are doing well selling their meth until Skinny Pete is robbed by one of his customers. When Jesse gives Walt his share, minus the stolen money, he explains that it is breakage—revenue loss from damaged, lost, or stolen goods—that must be expected as the cost of doing business. Walt, however, worries about what will happen when word gets out that they can be robbed with impunity. He later shows up at Jesse's apartment and gives him a gun, telling him to take care of the problem.

He also confronts Skyler over her smoking, but she refuses to apologize for keeping secrets when he has been doing the same. That night, Hank is woken by what he thinks are gunshots and goes through the house with his pistol drawn. It turns out to be caps popping off beer bottles due to pressure. The next day, he drives down to the Rio Grande and throws his trophy of Tuco's grill into the river.

Critical reception 
The episode was well received. Noel Murray, writing for The A.V. Club, gave the episode an A, praising the visual comparisons between different situations in the episode.

In 2019 The Ringer ranked "Breakage" 44th out of the 62 total Breaking Bad episodes.

References

External links 
"Breakage" at the official Breaking Bad site

2009 American television episodes
Breaking Bad (season 2) episodes